Busted is a song by American duo The Isley Brothers. It was released as a single from their 2003 album Body Kiss. The song was written and produced by R. Kelly. The song, features one member of R&B group JS Kim Johnson singing background vocal.

In this song played as a mini soap opera, Mr. Biggs (played by Ron Isley), has caught his girlfriend, Asia (played by Kim Johnson) getting out of Kellz (played by R.Kelly) car, where they had allegedly been going at it. He demands she leaves while Asia desperately pleads to stay and twist and shifts her story of where she was.

Lyrics

The opening consists of Mr. Biggs sighing and telling Asia he got something for her. Much of the rest of the song are verses performed by Asia and Mr.Biggs.

 Verse 1 : The verse begins with Mr. Biggs questioning Asia where she been after she came back at home late. Asia responds that she was with her girl best friends, then Mr Biggs tell Asia that he has called all her best friends (Kiesha and Tanya) and they were all at their houses, then Asia tells Biggs that are not her only friends, Asia then calms Mr Biggs and promise she gonna tell the truth "(Wait before you get all upset here's the truth)". Asia changes her story, tells Biggs that she was with her girlfriend who was cheated on by her boyfriend and biggs questions Asia again "But baby what's that got to do with you coming in at 2?" Mr Biggs then ask why she didn't pick her phone and call and Asia responds that she forgot, the last lines sees Mr Biggs asking Asia some question about her mysterious friend, she is seen hesitating while trying to answer the question.
 Verse 2 : In the second verse, Asia is heard saying she will tell the truth about what happened that night, while Mr. Biggs tell her to get out of the house. Asia tells Mr. Biggs that she went dancing with her friends Shaniqua, Shaquan, and Robin, and Mr Biggs changes the conversation, "Well if ya'll were going shopping why didn't you just check in?" She replies that her cellphone was off, then Mr. Biggs reminds her of what he asked, "Now earlier you said dancing, but when I just asked you said shopping - tell me which one you were doing?" In the last line Asia says she's innocent while Mr. Biggs tell her she is guilty.

Music video

The music video was directed by Bille Woodruff and was filmed in Beverly Hills, California, USA. The video featured an appearance by half-member of the Isley Brothers Ernie Isley. The video was uploaded on music video site VEVO. The music video follows the storyline of the song's lyrics.

It opens with Asia, played by Kim Johnson being dropped off on driveway by her alleged boyfriend played by R Kelly, she then creeps into the house at 2am. Mid-way in the video, Asia and Mr. Biggs (played by Ron Isley) are seen arguing and her making up lies about where she's been all night. Then Mr. Biggs tells Asia to go upstairs and pack her bags and she keeps begging and promising to tell the truth.
The video concludes with Mr. Biggs telling his brother to watch surveillance from that night, and they find Asia creeping with R. Kelly in the car. After saying she's "innocent", Asia gets kicked out of the house.

Charts

References

2003 singles
The Isley Brothers songs
Song recordings produced by R. Kelly
Songs written by R. Kelly
2001 songs
DreamWorks Records singles
Songs about infidelity